The 1960 Bowling Green Falcons football team was an American football team that represented Bowling Green State University in the Mid-American Conference (MAC) during the 1960 NCAA University Division football season. In their sixth season under head coach Doyt Perry, the Falcons compiled an 8–1 record (5–1 against MAC opponents), lost its only game to MAC champion Ohio (14-7), and outscored all opponents by a combined total of 196 to 61.

On October 29, 1960, the Falcons defeated Cal Poly, 50–6.  After the game, the Cal Poly team was in a deadly C-46 plane crash while taking off from the Toledo airport.

Schedule

References

Bowling Green
Bowling Green Falcons football seasons
Bowling Green Falcons football